Marko Batinica (born 31 May 1997) is a Serbian football midfielder, playing for OFK Beograd.

Career
In January 2020, Batinica joined Maltese club Senglea Athletic. He left the club again at the end of the season with zero appearances for the club.

Career statistics

Club

References

External links
 Marko Batinica stats at utakmica.rs
 

1997 births
Living people
Sportspeople from Smederevo
Association football midfielders
Serbian footballers
Serbian expatriate footballers
OFK Beograd players
Serbian First League players
Serbian SuperLiga players
Serbian expatriate sportspeople in Malta
Expatriate footballers in Malta